Robert James Kelly III (born June 21, 1974) is a former professional American football player who played safety for four seasons for the New Orleans Saints in the National Football League and one on the injured reserve list for the New England Patriots.

Career 
Kelly retired from football in 2002 and age 28, after he sustained an injury during training camp to a nerve between his neck and shoulder.

Health problems 
On February 2, 2018, Kelly's wife, Emily, co-wrote an article for The New York Times chronicling her husband's life after football.  She wrote that her husband had never used steroids or had a diagnosed brain injury, but starting in 2009, he began suffering mood swings and depression and later saw his weight plummet to 157 pounds by 2016.  She wrote that in 2013, the NFL player retirement plan and supplemental disability plan awarded him total and permanent disability benefits, which will provide monthly payments for the rest of his life.  She wrote that the clinician who examined Kelly concluded that "repeated concussion" likely had caused Kelly's "neuropsychological dysfunction."

Personal life 
Lives in Ohio.

References

External links
DeVito, Maria (February 9, 2018). "Newark Catholic's Rob Kelly: Game of football is too violent to play". The Newark Advocate.

1974 births
Living people
People from Mount Vernon, Ohio
Sportspeople from Newark, Ohio
American football safeties
Ohio State Buckeyes football players
New Orleans Saints players
New England Patriots players